The Palam metro station is a part of the Magenta Line, connecting Botanical Garden in Noida to Janakpuri in west Delhi. It was opened to public on 29 May 2018.

History

The station

Station layout

Entry/exit

Features
Under Phase III, Palam metro station is an underground station which has several first-of-its-kind features. In a first for a Metro station, Palam has parking space for 66 e-rickshaws where around six to seven charging points will be provided. E-rickshaws, apart from the Metro feeders, have emerged as a crucial link in the last-mile connectivity to and from metro stations in the city.

The station also has unique art installations. The passage between exit gates two and three, which has already been opened for public to use as a subway to cross the road, has a rooftop installation depicting the blue sky, while the walls are decked with handmade ceramic tiles.

There is also a heavy use of glass separators to divide the station area. The division at the automatic fare collection (AFC) gates will also help control crowd and facilitate faster entry and exit.

Gallery

Connections
The Janakpuri West – Botanical Garden corridor passing through Palam metro station. The station connects important locations such as the Indira Gandhi International Airport – Domestic Terminal, Hauz Khas, IIT Delhi, Nehru Place, Jamia Milia University and Noida.

Rail
Palam railway station of Indian Railways is also situated nearby this metro station.

See also

Delhi
Palam
List of Delhi Metro stations
Transport in Delhi
Delhi Metro Rail Corporation
Delhi Suburban Railway
Delhi Monorail
Indira Gandhi International Airport
Delhi Transport Corporation
South West Delhi
National Capital Region (India)
List of rapid transit systems
List of metro systems

References

External links

 Delhi Metro Rail Corporation Ltd. (Official site)
 Delhi Metro Annual Reports
 

Delhi Metro stations
Railway stations in West Delhi district